Payra Port Authority is an autonomous port authority in charge of the third port in Port of Payra, Bangladesh, and is located in Patuakhali, Bangladesh. The chairman of the Payra port authority is Rear Admiral M Sohail.

History
The Port authority and the port was established on 19 November 2013 through the Payra Sea Port Act 2013. The port started commercial operations from August 2016 under the port authority. In 2016 China Harbour Engineering Company and China State Construction Engineering had signed an agreement with the authority to improve the port. The deals were worth more than US$500 million and were signed in the Ministry of Shipping in Dhaka. The same year the port authority signed an agreement with Bangladesh Navy to build the approach road to the port.

In December 2017 Jan De Nul started proceeding on a 550 Million Euro dredging contract. Payra Port is the 3rd sea port of Bangladesh located in general area in between latitude 21o15’- 22o00’ North and longitude 90o00’- 90o30’.

References

Government agencies of Bangladesh
2013 establishments in Bangladesh
Organisations based in Patuakhali
Port authorities

Port authorities in Bangladesh